René 'Boy' Konen (23 April 1921 – 14 November 1994) was a Luxembourgish politician and government minister.  He served as Minister for Public Works under Pierre Werner, between 1979 and 1984.  Before this, he had been President of the Democratic Party, to which he belonged, and a member of the communal council of Luxembourg City.  He sat in the Chamber of Deputies between 1974 and 1979 and again, after his ministerial stint, from 1984 until 1993.

He gave his name to the René Konen Tunnel in Luxembourg City, construction of which began when Konen was Minister for Public Works.  His nickname is also borne by Stade Boy Konen, a sports facility in Luxembourg City used as the national rugby union team's home ground.

|-

Ministers for Public Works of Luxembourg
Councillors in Luxembourg City
Members of the Chamber of Deputies (Luxembourg)
Democratic Party (Luxembourg) politicians
1921 births
1994 deaths
People from Weiswampach